The Iron Giant is the 1999 animated science fiction film directed by Brad Bird (in his feature directorial debut) for Warner Bros. Feature Animation. The film featured original score composed by Michael Kamen, in his first and only collaboration with Bird, as all his future films were scored by Michael Giacchino beginning with The Incredibles (2004). The score featured additional performance from the Czech Philharmonic symphony orchestra at Prague, conducted by Kamen himself and recording of the score happened within one week.

The film had two soundtracks being released for the promotions of the film. The first soundtrack is a collection of compilation songs performed by popular artists from the 1950s and 1960s, while the second featured Kamen's original score and a song which he performed along with Eric Clapton. All the two albums were released by Rhino Entertainment and Varèse Sarabande in August 1999. The score album had subsequent releases: a vinyl remastered album published by Mondo and a deluxe edition, containing additional material from the score, including a vinyl release in the future.

The score received positive critical reception, praising Kamen's composition. For his score, Kamen won the Annie Award for Music in an Animated Feature Production.

Production 
Bird's original temp score, "a collection of Bernard Herrmann cues from '50s and '60s sci-fi films," initially scared Kamen. Believing the sound of the orchestra is important to the feeling of the film, Kamen "decided to comb eastern Europe for an "old-fashioned" sounding orchestra and went to Prague to hear Vladimir Ashkenazy conduct the Czech Philharmonic in Strauss's An Alpine Symphony." Eventually, the Czech Philharmonic was the orchestra used for the film's score, with Bird describing the symphony orchestra as "an amazing collection of musicians." The score for The Iron Giant was recorded in a rather unconventional manner, compared to most films: recorded over one week at the Rudolfinum in Prague, the music was recorded without conventional uses of syncing the music, in a method Kamen described in a 1999 interview as "[being able to] play the music as if it were a piece of classical repertoire."

Reception 
Heather Pheras of Allmusic wrote "Michael Kamen's orchestral score for The Iron Giant reflects the childlike wonder and impressive quality of this triumphant animated film." James Southall of Movie Wave called the score as his personal favourite, saying "Everything about it is just in a different class from most modern film music. The performance, by the Czech Philharmonic, shows just what a difference a good orchestra can make to a score when the conductor allows them a degree of freedom of expression; and Steve McLaughlin's recording showcases all of the orchestra's strongest assets.  Those willing to approach the score with an open mind, and willing to give it a few chances to allow Kamen's delicately-woven web to envelop them, are in for a real treat.  So few film composers were able to write music of this incredible structure and detail, where every piece has a beginning, a middle and an end, where the score as a whole actually goes on a journey from one place to another; Michael Kamen, you will be sorely missed."

Filmtracks.com wrote "The music relies on its sheer weight to define itself, and because of its great recording and creative orchestrations, it works. But it remains difficult not to speculate about how immensely rewarding The Iron Giant might have been if the themes for the boy and robot were better enunciated. Some might say that such catering is unnecessary and the vagueness is an impressive attribute. But without readily identifiable themes, the score has no calling card outside of its huge heart." Jonathan Broxton wrote "For many film score fans, Michael Kamen is a love-him-or-loathe-him composer who, despite having written such wonderful works as Mr. Holland's Opus and Don Juan DeMarco, still has a fair amount of detractors. Hopefully, The Iron Giant will dispel the misconceptions about Kamen’s talent and make more people aware of the gifts he has." Broxton referred it as "most surprisingly accomplished film scores of the year".

Dan Goldwasser of Soundtrack.Net wrote "The Iron Giant was a great piece of film (which sadly got overlooked by many) and it was up to Kamen to provide the emotional core through the music. He does everything right – the orchestra is large and powerful, the music is sweeping and emotional – but the lack of a central theme makes this score sound like underscore." Pete Simons of Synchrotones opined that "The Iron Giant is a great film with a great score, which you can now study note by note." Reviewing for the deluxe edition, Zanobard Reviews praised the music and said "Michael Kamen’s score for The Iron Giant is utterly magical, and an incredible listening experience from beginning to end as a result. It’s odd in that you wouldn’t really expect a film score like this to work in concept; it has barely any themes and works much more like a symphony than a score, and yet the orchestration tells the story of Hogarth and the Giant so brilliantly that it doesn’t even need themes to understand what’s going on. From the light flurries of strings for Hogarth’s adventures to the proudly hopeful brass for the heroism of the Giant, it works amazingly well. That combined with a really well-crafted, almost classical orchestral sound and many a wonderful new track as a result of Varèse Sarabande’s excellent new deluxe edition not only makes Kamen’s work here an incredible soundtrack, but also cements it as one of the better film scores for an animated film around."

Track listing

Soundtrack 

The Iron Giant (Original Motion Picture Soundtrack) is the soundtrack album, consisting a compilation of classical, pop and jazz songs from the 1950s and 1960s. It also included two tracks from Kamen's score, which was published by Rhino Entertainment on August 3, 1999 in CDs and cassettes.

Score

Standard edition 

The Iron Giant (Original Motion Picture Score) is the score album, consisting 23 tracks of the score, composed and produced by Kamen. It also includes an original song "Souls Don't Die" performed by Kamen and Eric Clapton. The album was released by Varèse Sarabande on August 24, 1999. A 2-disc vinyl edition of the soundtrack was published by Mondo and released on September 18, 2014.

Deluxe edition 

The deluxe edition of the album consisted 37 tracks, including the tracks from the first release, extended cues featured in the film and pre-recorded cues that were not included in the album. Varèse Sarabande released the album on March 11, 2022. In that May, a vinyl edition of the soundtrack was officially announced by Mondo, and the album was released into a two-disc set on July 22.

Release history

Personnel 
Credits adapted from CD liner notes.

 Original score composed and conducted by – Michael Kamen
 Music production – Steve McLaughlin, Teese Gohl, Christopher Brooks, Michael Kamen
 Bass and soloist – "Dean" Chucho Merchan
 Orchestra – The Czech Philharmonic Orchestra
 Orchestration – Blake Neely, Michael Kamen, Robert Elhai
 Recording and mixing – Steve McLaughlin
 Recording engineer – Cenek Kotzmann, Lubomir Novacek, Marlon Kelsey, Oldrich Slezak, Tom Jenkins
 Music editor – Christopher Brooks
 Music preparation – Vic Fraser
 Executive producer – Cary E. Mansfield, Chas Ferry, Robert Townson
 Musical assistance – James Brett, Michael Price
 Production assistance – Lukas Kendall, Moritz Fink
 Art direction – Rob Jones, Mark Shoolery
 Design – Jason Edmiston, Mark Shoolery
 Liner notes – Tim Greiving

Charts

Weekly charts

Year-end charts

References 

1999 soundtrack albums
Varèse Sarabande soundtracks
Rhino Entertainment soundtracks
Classical albums
Jazz soundtracks
Pop soundtracks
Film scores
Michael Kamen albums